Clara Livingston (1900 in Chautauqua, New York,– January 29, 1992 in Puerto Rico) was the 200th licensed female pilot and 11th female helicopter pilot in the world. 

Livingston made her first airplane trip in 1927. She was the daughter of Alfred Livingston. In the 1940s Livingston enlisted in the Women's Army Corps (WAC). At the age of 25, her father died and she managed his property, in Dorado, Puerto Rico, for the next two decades. She built her own landing strip, known as Dorado Airport, on this  property. In 1937, Amelia Earhart, who was a friend of Livingston's, made a stop during her last flight at the Isla Grande airport and stayed overnight. Her home is well recognized in a community known as Dorado Beach for being a historical house which she rebuilt in 1928.

References

External links
Dorado Beach History
Dorado Beach Airport at Abandoned & Little-Known Airfields: Eastern Puerto Rico
International Women Air & Space Museum

1900 births
1992 deaths
American women aviators
People of the Civil Air Patrol
Helicopter pilots
Women's Army Corps soldiers
American aviators